The Loye and Alden Miller Research Award, now known as the AOS Miller Award, was established in 1993 by the Cooper Ornithological Society (COS) to recognize lifetime achievement in ornithological research. The namesakes were Loye H. Miller and his son Alden H. Miller, both of whom focused largely on ornithology.
 
Since the merger of the Cooper Ornithological Society with the American Ornithologists' Union to form the American Ornithological Society in 2016 the award has been presented by the latter.

Recipients of the award
Source:  American Ornithological Society
Cooper Ornithological Society
 1993 – George Bartholomew
 1994 – Storrs Olson
 1995 – Barbara De Wolfe
 1996 – William Dawson
 1997 – Robert Storer
 1998 – Russell Balda
 1999 – Gordon Orians
 2000 – Ernst Mayr
 2001 – Frank Pitelka
 2002 – Richard Holmes
 2003 – Peter and Rosemary Grant
 2004 – Alexander Skutch
 2005 – John Wiens
 2006 – Robert Ricklefs
 2007 – Robert Payne
 2008 – Peter Marler
 2009 – Frances James
 2010 – Keith A. Hobson
 2011 – Susan Haig
 2012 – Thomas Martin
 2013 – Trevor Price
 2014 – Ellen Ketterson
 2015 – Jerram Brown
 2016 – Walter D. Koenig

American Ornithological Society
 2017 - Carol Vleck
 2018 - Janis Dickinson
 2019 - A. Townsend Peterson

See also

 List of ornithology awards

References

Ornithology awards
Awards established in 1993
American awards